The Gabor sisters were three Hungarian-American actresses/socialites: Magda (June 11, 1915 – June 6, 1997), Zsa Zsa (February 6, 1917 – December 18, 2016), and Eva (February 11, 1919 – July 4, 1995). Born in Budapest, Hungary, the trio relocated to the United States in hopes of starting film careers.

Outside of their careers, they were each well known for their serial matrimony: Magda was married six times; Zsa Zsa nine times; and Eva five times. British actor George Sanders was first married to Zsa Zsa and later to Magda, though the latter marriage only lasted one month.

History

The Gabor sisters were born into a family of Hungarian-Jewish background, in Budapest, Hungary to parents Vilmos and Jolie Gabor. The family moved to New York in the wake of World War II. Magda had played a small role in a Hungarian film before the war, so Jolie and her three daughters moved to Hollywood to break into the film business. Eva was the first of the sisters to immigrate to the US, shortly after her first marriage, to a Swedish osteopath, Dr. Eric Drimmer, whom she married in 1937 when she was 18 years old.

In 1953, Eva was given her own television talk show, The Eva Gabor Show, which ran for one season (1953–54). Both of her sisters appeared on the show in guest spots. From September 1965 through April 1971, Eva starred in the CBS sitcom Green Acres, which proved to be a ratings success.

Zsa Zsa's only child, Francesca Hilton, was born on March 10, 1947, by then-husband Conrad Hilton. Zsa Zsa was the only Gabor sister to have a child. Francesca Hilton died on January 5, 2015, at the age of 67, from an apparent stroke or heart attack. She had no children.

Widespread fame
The sisters were well-known socialites, with Eva and Zsa Zsa becoming notable for their acting and personality work. Both sisters had recurring roles on hit series such as Climax!, The Love Boat, and The Matinee Theater, at separate times, and appeared as themselves regularly on Hollywood Squares, The Dean Martin Show, and The Merv Griffin Show. In his autobiography, television host Merv Griffin, who was known to spend time with  Eva socially, wrote of the Gabor sisters' initial presence in New York and Los Angeles:
All these years later, it's hard to describe the phenomenon of the three glamorous Gabor girls and their ubiquitous mother. They burst onto the society pages and into the gossip columns so suddenly, and with such force, it was as if they'd been dropped out of the sky.

Deaths
The youngest sister, Eva predeceased her elder sisters and her mother. Eva died in Los Angeles on July 4, 1995, from respiratory failure and pneumonia, following a fall in a bathtub in Mexico, where she had been on vacation. Her funeral was held on July 11, 1995, at Good Shepherd Catholic Church in Beverly Hills.

Their mother, Jolie, was apparently never told of Eva's death and died less than two years later, in Palm Springs, California, of natural causes on April 1, 1997, at age 100. The cause of death was declared as kidney failure. Two months after Jolie's death, Magda died on June 6, 1997, five days before her 82nd birthday. 

Francesca Hilton, Zsa Zsa's daughter, died in 2015. Zsa Zsa was reportedly never told of her daughter's death. Zsa Zsa died at the age of 99 of cardiac arrest while in a coma at Ronald Reagan UCLA Medical Center on December 18, 2016, 50 days shy of becoming a centenarian. The causes of death were given as "Cardiopulmonary arrest, Coronary Artery Disease, and Cerebral Vascular Disease". She had been on life support for the previous five years.

Appearances together

Bibliography

References

American socialites
Gabor family
Sibling groups
Hungarian Jews
Sisters
1910s births